The 1958 Pittsburgh Steelers season was the franchise's 26th in the National Football League.

After the second game of the season, Steelers coach Buddy Parker, formerly in Detroit, arranged a trade on October 6 that sent quarterback Earl Morrall and two draft picks to the Detroit Lions for quarterback Bobby Layne, a future hall of famer.

Regular season

Schedule

Game summaries

Week 1 (Sunday September 28, 1958): San Francisco 49ers 

at Kezar Stadium, San Francisco, California

 Game time: 
 Game weather: 
 Game attendance: 32,150
 Referee: 
 TV announcers: 

Scoring Drives:

 San Francisco – McElhenny 2 run (Soltau kick)
 Pittsburgh – Mathews 10 pass from Morrall (Miner kick)
 Pittsburgh – FG Miner 22
 Pittsburgh – Younger 1 run (Miner kick)
 Pittsburgh – FG Miner 23
 San Francisco – Pace 11 run (kick blocked)
 San Francisco – Brodie 1 run (Soltau kick)
 San Francisco – FG Soltau 22

Week 2 (Sunday October 5, 1958): Cleveland Browns  
 

at Pitt Stadium   Pittsburgh, Pennsylvania

 Game time: 
 Game weather: 
 Game attendance: 31,130
 Referee: 
 TV announcers: 

Scoring Drives:

 Cleveland – Brown 23 run (Groza kick)
 Cleveland – Mitchell 21 pass from Plum (Groza kick)
 Cleveland – Brewster 8 pass from Plum (Groza kick)
 Pittsburgh – Tracy 1 run (Miner kick)
 Pittsburgh – FG Miner 31
 Cleveland – FG Groza 32
 Cleveland – Brown 59 run (Groza kick)
 Cleveland – Brown 3 run (Groza kick)
 Cleveland – P. Carpenter 4 pass from Ninowski (Groza kick)
 Pittsburgh – Safety, Ninowski tackled by Stautner in end zone

Week 3 (Sunday October 12, 1958): Philadelphia Eagles  

at Forbes Field, Pittsburgh, Pennsylvania

 Game time: 
 Game weather: 
 Game attendance: 23,153
 Referee: 
 TV announcers: 

Scoring Drives:

 Pittsburgh – Tracy 31 run (Miner kick)
 Philadelphia – FG Walston 36
 Pittsburgh – Younger 1 run (Miner kick)
 Pittsburgh – Tracy 1 run (Miner kick)
 Pittsburgh – FG Miner 26

Week 4 (Sunday October 19, 1958): Cleveland Browns  

at Cleveland Municipal Stadium, Cleveland, Ohio

 Game time: 
 Game weather: 
 Game attendance: 66,852
 Referee: 
 TV announcers: 

Scoring Drives:

 Pittsburgh – Mathews 64 pass from Tracy (Miner kick)
 Cleveland – Brown 27 pass from Plum (Groza kick)
 Cleveland – Brown 48 run (Plum kick)
 Cleveland – Renfro 36 pass from Plum (Plum kick)
 Cleveland – Mitchell 7 pass from Plum (kick failed)
 Pittsburgh – FG Miner 47

Week 5 (Sunday October 26, 1958): New York Giants  

at Yankee Stadium, Bronx, New York

 Game time: 
 Game weather: 
 Game attendance: 25,007
 Referee: 
 TV announcers: 

Scoring Drives:

 New York Giants – Karilivacz 23 fumble run (Summerall kick)
 Pittsburgh – FG Miner 27
 New York Giants – FG Summerall 34
 Pittsburgh – FG Miner 39
 New York Giants – Heinrich 1 run (Summerall kick)

Week 6 (Sunday November 2, 1958): Washington Redskins  

at Forbes Field, Pittsburgh, Pennsylvania

 Game time: 
 Game weather: 
 Game attendance: 19,525
 Referee: 
 TV announcers: 

Scoring Drives:

 Washington – FG Baker 13
 Pittsburgh – Orr 19 pass from Layne (Miner kick)
 Pittsburgh – Younger 2 run (Miner kick)
 Washington – FG Baker 27
 Pittsburgh – Mathews 62 pass from Layne (Miner kick)
 Washington – FG Baker 32
 Pittsburgh – FG Miner 43
 Washington – Walton 26 pass from Guglielmi (Baker kick)

Week 7 (Sunday November 9, 1958): Philadelphia Eagles  

at Franklin Field, Philadelphia, Pennsylvania

 Game time: 
 Game weather: 
 Game attendance: 26,306
 Referee: 
 TV announcers: 

Scoring Drives:

 Pittsburgh – FG Miner 38
 Philadelphia – Retzlaff 18 pass from Barnes (Walston kick)
 Pittsburgh – Tracy 13 pass from Layne (Miner kick)
 Pittsburgh – Tracy 25 pass from Layne (Miner kick)
 Philadelphia – FG Walston 16
 Philadelphia – Barnes 3 run (Walston kick)
 Pittsburgh – Mathews 34 pass from Layne (Miner kick)
 Pittsburgh – Tracy 40 pass from Layne (Miner kick)
 Philadelphia – McDonald 10 pass from Van Brocklin (Walston kick)

Week 8 (Sunday November 16, 1958): New York Giants  

at Forbes Field, Pittsburgh, Pennsylvania

 Game time: 
 Game weather: 
 Game attendance: 30,030
 Referee: 
 TV announcers: 

Scoring Drives:

 New York Giants – Gifford 1 run (Summerall kick)
 New York Giants – FG Summerall 42
 Pittsburgh – Layne 1 run (Miner kick)
 Pittsburgh – Tracy 9 pass from Layne (Miner kick)
 Pittsburgh – Glick 37 fumble run (Miner kick)
 Pittsburgh – FG Miner 43 (Miner kick)
 Pittsburgh – Layne 1 run (Miner kick)

Week 9 (Sunday November 23, 1958): Chicago Cardinals  

at Comiskey Park, Chicago, Illinois

 Game time: 
 Game weather: 
 Game attendance: 15,946
 Referee: 
 TV announcers: 

Scoring Drives:

 Chicago Cardinals – Matson 101 kick return (Conrad kick)
 Pittsburgh – Elter 5 run (Miner kick)
 Pittsburgh – FG Miner 37
 Chicago Cardinals – FG Conrad 38
 Pittsburgh – Elter 8 run (Miner kick)
 Pittsburgh – FG Miner 30
 Chicago Cardinals – FG Conrad 12
 Chicago Cardinals – Matson 1 run (Conrad kick)
 Pittsburgh – Orr 78 pass from Layne (Miner kick)

Week 10 (Sunday November 30, 1958): Chicago Bears  

at Forbes Field, Pittsburgh, Pennsylvania

 Game time: 
 Game weather: 
 Game attendance: 20,094
 Referee: 
 TV announcers: 

Scoring Drives:

 Pittsburgh – Tracy 30 run (Miner kick)
 Pittsburgh – FG Miner 22
 Chicago Bears – Jewett 13 pass from Brown (Blanda kick)
 Chicago Bears – FG Blanda 34
 Pittsburgh – Orr 48 pass from Layne (Miner kick)
 Pittsburgh – Tracy 18 run (Miner kick)

Week 11 (Sunday December 7, 1958): Washington Redskins  

at Griffith Stadium, Washington, DC

 Game time: 
 Game weather: 
 Game attendance: 23,370
 Referee: 
 TV announcers: 

Scoring Drives:

 Washington – Bosseler 7 run (Baker kick)
 Washington – Bosseler 2 run (Baker kick)
 Pittsburgh – Orr 55 pass from Layne (Miner kick)
 Pittsburgh – McClairen 28 pass from Layne (Miner kick)

Week 12 (Saturday December 13, 1958): Chicago Cardinals  

at Pitt Stadium, Pittsburgh, Pennsylvania

 Game time: 
 Game weather: Sunny, cold (the water pipes in Pitt Stadium froze)
 Game attendance: 16,660
 Referee: 
 TV announcers: 

Scoring Drives:

 Pittsburgh – Orr 36 pass from Layne (Miner kick)
 Chicago Cardinals – Matson 92 kick return (Conrad kick)
 Pittsburgh – FG Miner 13
 Pittsburgh – Layne 17 run (Miner kick)
 Chicago Cardinals – Watkins 48 pass from Reynolds (Conrad kick)
 Pittsburgh – Orr 17 pass from Layne (Miner kick)
 Chicago Cardinals – Matson 1 run (Conrad kick)
 Pittsburgh – Orr 72 pass from Tracy (Miner kick)
 Pittsburgh – Reynolds 5 run (Miner kick)

Standings

References  

Pittsburgh Steelers seasons
Pittsburgh Steelers
Pitts